Henniges Automotive, based in Auburn Hills, Michigan is a company producing anti-vibration components and encapsulated glass systems. The company was founded in 1863. 

In 2015, Henniges Automotives was acquired by AVIC Automotive Systems Holding Co Ltd, a wholly owned subsidiary of China's state-owned aerospace and defence conglomerate Aviation Industry Corporation of China (AVIC). Henniges called the deal "one of the largest acquisitions by a Chinese company of a U.S.-based automotive manufacturing company in history."

In August 2019, Senate Finance Committee Chairman Chuck Grassley has called on the Treasury Department to investigate CFIUS's 2015 approval of AVIC's acquisition of Henniges, which, since the acquisition, has opened plants in Suzhou, China; Prudnik, Poland and a European headquarters in Mladá Boleslav, Czech Republic. The state-run AVIC was involved in stealing sensitive data regarding the Joint Strike Fighter program and later incorporated the stolen data into China's Chengdu J-20 and Shenyang FC-31 fighters. In 2020, President Donald Trump told a rally at MBS International Airport that Hunter Biden "facilitated the sale of a Michigan automotive company to a leading Chinese military defense contractor."

Locations

North America

United States 

 Auburn Hills, Michigan
 Keokuk, Iowa
 New Haven, Missouri
 Reidsville, North Carolina
 Frederick, Oklahoma

Canada 

 Burlington, Ontario

Mexico 

 Torreón
 Gómez Palacio, Durango
 Zapopan

Europe

Germany 

 Viersen
 Rehburg-Loccum
 Munich

Poland 

 Prudnik

Czech Republic 

 Hranice
 Kosmonosy

Asia

China 

 Changchun
 Tieling
 Beijing
 Taicang
 Chengdu
Suzhou

South America

Brazil 

 Jundiai

See also 

 Zakłady Przemysłu Bawełnianego "Frotex"

References 

Auto parts suppliers of the United States
Vehicle manufacturing companies established in 1863
American companies established in 1863
Manufacturing companies based in Michigan 
Auburn Hills, Michigan
Prudnik